Manche is a coastal French département in Normandy, on the English Channel, which is known as La Manche, literally "the sleeve", in French. It had a population of 495,045 in 2019.

History 
Manche is one of the original 83 départements created during the French Revolution on March 4, 1790. It was created from part of the province of Normandie.

The first capital was Coutances until 1796, and it resumed that role after World War II because of the almost complete destruction of Saint-Lô during the battle of Normandy following D-Day. When Saint-Lô was rebuilt, it once again became the capital.

Geography 

The department includes the Cotentin Peninsula down to the famous Mont St Michel. Of the off-shore Channel Islands, only  the island of Chausey forms part of the territory of the department.

Manche borders the Normandy departments of Calvados to the east and Orne to the southeast. Mayenne, a department of the Pays de la Loire, is to the south-east, and Ille-et-Vilaine in Brittany is to the south-west. The salient of this department is the longest in France. It also being the second longest salient in Europe, after Odessa Oblast in Ukraine.

The region is lush and green with sandy beaches, remaining very rural and farming oriented. The peninsula was originally joined as a single land mass to Cornwall and Dorset in England, meaning that the underlying geological strata of both countrysides are very similar. Consequently there are substantial regional differences today in terms of flora and fauna, and farming practices have varied considerably between the UK and France. Flat marsh areas in the department are known for their bird watching. The region in and around St Lô is also the horse capital of France, where the cooler climate compared to the south is ideal for breeding and training.

France's first EPR nuclear reactor is under construction at Flamanville near Cherbourg. Start-up is scheduled for the end of 2023.

Principal towns

The most populous commune is Cherbourg-en-Cotentin; the prefecture Saint-Lô is the second-most populous. As of 2019, there are 6 communes with more than 10,000 inhabitants:

Climate 
The climate is oceanic, with relatively mild winters - temperatures can go below zero for a few days occasionally. Temperate summers, around 20 °C, can occasionally reach 35 °C in direct sunlight. Precipitation is substantial, and varies greatly by region, between 700mm on the coast and 1300mm in the southern central area. Highly localised, not life-threatening flash flooding has been experienced over the last few years in the spring period.

The west coast benefits from the Gulf stream's influence, allowing for the naturalization of Mediterranean and exotic plants like mimosas, palms, and agaves.

There is often a sea breeze on the coast, which combined with tides contributes to quick temperature changes over a single day. Sea temperatures can be very pleasant for swimming between June and October.

Demographics 
Inhabitants of the department are called Manchots or Manchois.

Population development since 1801:

Politics

The president of the Departmental Council is Jean Morin, elected in July 2021.

Presidential elections 2nd round

Current National Assembly Representatives

Sports

 Football: main clubs: AS Cherbourg, US Avranches, FC Saint-Lô, US Granville, CS Villedieu, FC Équeurdreville-Hainneville...
 Cycling: the Tour de France has visited the department 21 times with stages ending at Cherbourg (16), Avranches (2), Granville (1), Saint-Hilaire-du-Harcouët (1), and the Mont-Saint-Michel (1).
 Sailing: the Solitaire du Figaro has come to Cherbourg several times.
 Tennis: hosts the Challenger La Manche tournament.
 Thai boxing: Villedieu-les-Poêles
 Badminton: Two local clubs compete in the national championship (N3): St Hilaire du Harcouet and Hainneville.
 Golf: course: Granville, Bréhal, Coutainville, Cherbourg, Centre Manche, Fontenay, Côte des Isles

Tourism

See also
 Cantons of the Manche department
 Communes of the Manche department
 Arrondissements of the Manche department
 Cotentinais, the Norman dialect of Manche.

References

External links

  Prefecture website
  Departmental Council website

  
  A whole wiki about the Manche !
  Comité départemental du tourisme de la Manche

 
1790 establishments in France
Departments of Normandy
States and territories established in 1790